Tishabee, also known as Garretts Shop, is an unincorporated community in Greene County, Alabama, United States.

History
The name Tishabee is derived from the Choctaw words tishu, meaning "assistant (to the chief)" and abi, meaning "killer". The community was first settled in 1817 by Richard Bragg, who also developed Bragg's Bluff. A post office operated under the name Tishabee from 1883 to 1901.

References

Unincorporated communities in Alabama
Unincorporated communities in Greene County, Alabama
Alabama placenames of Native American origin